Paul Gunter is a co-founder of the Clamshell Alliance anti-nuclear group, who was arrested at Seabrook Station Nuclear Power Plant for non-violent civil disobedience on several occasions. An energy policy analyst and activist, he has been a vocal critic of nuclear power for more than 30 years.  Gunter worked as the Director of the Reactor Watchdog Project for Nuclear Information and Resource Service for almost 20 years. In 2007, Gunter joined Beyond Nuclear as their nuclear reactor specialist. He has made many national and international television, radio, and conference appearances and is quoted in the press.

In 2008, Gunter won the Jane Bagley Lehman Award from the Tides Foundation for outstanding achievements in "the fight against nuclear power".

See also
Anti-nuclear movement in the United States
Anti-nuclear protests in the United States

References

External links
 Beyond Nuclear 2013 response to the views of Hansen, Caldeira, Emanuel, and Wigley, about nuclear power.

Year of birth missing (living people)
Living people
American anti–nuclear power activists
Nonviolence advocates